Ptychobela schoedei is a species of sea snail, a marine gastropod mollusk in the family Pseudomelatomidae, the turrids and allies.

Description

Distribution
This marine species occurs off Sumatra, Indonesia.

References

 Thiele, J. 1925. Gastropoda der Deutschen Tiefsee-Expedition. II. Teil. pp. in Chun, C. Wissenschaftliche Ergebnisse der Deutschen Tiefsee-Expedition auf dem Damfper "Valdivia" 1898–1899. Jena : Gustav Fischer Vol. 17(2) 348 pp., 34 pls.

External links
 

schoedei
Gastropods described in 1925